The Climate of Ethiopia is highly diverse, ranging from equatorial rainforest with high rainfall and humidity in the south and southwest, to Afromontane regions on the summits of Semien and Bale Mountains to desert region in northeast, east and southeast Ethiopia. Ethiopia has three climatic zones, Alpine vegetated zones also known as Dega, the temperate zone (Weyna Dega), and the hot zone (Qola).

Ethiopian seasons are classified into three: the driest season is called Bega (October to January), Belg (February to May) and the rainy season Kiremt (June to September). This seasonal rainfall is impacted by the oscillation and migration of the Intertropical Convergence Zone (ITCZ) across the equator of northern region of the country in July and August, to its south bending its position over the southern Kenya in January and February. 

Climate change is a basic concern in Ethiopia, especially since the 1970s. Between the mid-1970s and late 2000s, Ethiopia's rainfall precipitation in some areas and seasons decreased by 15-20 percent. Furthermore, numerous studies predict climate change will increasingly affect the country's ecosystem, causing drought and famines. It was predicted that its climate will warm up 0.7°C and 2.3 by the 2020s and between 1.4°C and 2.9°C by the 2050s. The government of Ethiopia initiated a green economy policy to counter climate change and foster economic development such as the 2011 Climate Resilient Green Economy (CRGE).

Features
Ethiopia has diverse climate and landscape, ranging from equatorial rainforest with high rainfall and humidity in the south and southwest, to the Afro-Alpine on the summits of the Semien and Bale Mountains, to desert like condition in the northeast, east and southeast lowland. Ethiopia generally exhibits largely arid with high variability of precipitation falls into three zones: the Alpine vegetated cool zones, also known as Dega, with areas over 2,600 meters above sea level, where temperatures range from cold 16°C; the temperate session known as Woyna Dega zones, where much of the country's population concentrated in areas between 1,500 and 2,500 meters above sea level where temperatures range between 16°C and 30°C; and  the hot session known as Qola zone, encompassing both tropical and arid regions, having temperatures ranging 27°C to 50°C.

Ethiopia is ecologically diverse country. Most of the highland regions like Lalibela and Gondar are at an elevation above 2,000m (6,561ft), enjoying considerable climate year-round. Mean annual temperatures are around 15–20°C in these high-altitude regions, whilst 25–30°C in the lowlands.

Seasons

Ethiopia has distinct types of season: the Bega (October to January), Belg (February to May) and Kiremt (June to September). The driest season is Bega, whereas the main rainy season is Kiremt in which 85% to 95% food crops are produced. Main rainfall occurs between March and September. Rains typically begin in the south and central parts of the country during the Belg season, then goes to northward, with central and northern Ethiopia receiving most of their precipitation during the Kiremt season. In these seasons, rainfall totals up to 500 mm, that means adequate for watering for viable farming and pastures.

Seasonal rainfall in Ethiopia basically occurs by the migration of the intertropical Convergence Zone (ITCZ), which tends fluctuating over course of years, oscillating across the equator from its northern most position over northern Ethiopia in July and August, to its south bending its position over the southern Kenya in January and February.

Climate change effects
 
During the mid-1970s and the late 2000s, rainfall decreased during Belg and Kiremt seasons by 15–20% across parts of southern, southwestern, and southeastern Ethiopia. The area receiving sufficient rainfall for agriculture during the Belg season decreased by 16 percent in the twenty years up to 2012.

Ethiopia's climate will further be warming of 0.7°C and 2.3 by the 2020s and between 1.4°C and 2.9°C by the 2050s. Overall, climate change affects Ethiopia's population mainly by causing recurring droughts, especially since 1970s. The county's vulnerability to climate change could increase irrevocable poverty, rapid population growth, and dependency on rain-fed agriculture. Other factors are environmental degradation (e.g., deforestation), chronic food security, and recurring natural droughts, that may contribute for shaping the climate change in Ethiopia.

In response to experience, the Ethiopian government began developing a green economy policy to counter climate change under a single policy: the 2011 Climate Resilient Green Economy (CRGE) strategy. The strategy aimed to promote a green economy with economic development by curbing greenhouse gas emissions.

References

Climate of Ethiopia
Geography of Ethiopia